Virgil Macey Williams (October 29, 1830 - December 18, 1886) was an American painter, and the director of the San Francisco School of Design (now known as San Francisco Art Institute). In 1872, he co-founded the San Francisco Art Association with Juan B. Wandesforde.

Students of Williams included Harry Stuart Fonda, John Marshall Gamble, amongst others.

References

1830 births
1886 deaths
People from Dixfield, Maine
People from Napa County, California
Artists from San Francisco
Brown University alumni
American male painters
Painters from California
19th-century American painters
19th-century American male artists